Kadiyala Venkateswara Rao (born 7 April 1948) is a retired sports Deputy director in Sports Authority of Andhra Pradesh, a professional freelance-archaeologist. He hails from Tenali in Guntur district, Andhra Pradesh. He is credited with the exploration and identification of a large number of prehistoric and Buddhist sites in Andhra Pradesh in the recent years. (2010–2014)

Discoveries & Explorations
 Buddhist and Prehistoric site at Mallepadu (near Tenali) in Guntur district.
 Buddhist site at Pondugula in Krishna district.
 Buddhist site at Parupaka in East Godavari district.
 Buddhist site at Ayyapparaju Kothapalli, Tondangi Mandal in East Godavari district.
 Prehistoric site at Tetagunta in East Godavari district.
 Prehistoric site at Sangamayyakonda near Amudalavalasa in Srikakulam district.
 Prehistoric site at Dannanapeta near Amudalavalasa in Srikakulam district
 Prehistoric site at Chittivalasa, Sailada Hills near Amudalavalasa in Srikakulam district.

References

External links

1948 births
Living people
20th-century Indian archaeologists
Telugu people
People from Tenali
Scientists from Andhra Pradesh